Malin Holta (born 9 June 1993) is a female Norwegian handball player for Siófok KC.   

She also represented Norway in the 2012 Women's Junior World Handball Championship, placing 8th.

Achievements
Norwegian League
 Bronze Medalist: 2020/2021
Norwegian Cup:
Finalist: 2020

Individual awards
 All-Star Left Back of REMA 1000-ligaen: 2020/2021
REMA 1000-ligaen: Top scorer 2020/2021 (75 goals)
Grundigligaen: Top scorer 2015/2016 (129 goals)

References 
   

Norwegian female handball players
1993 births
Living people  
Expatriate handball players
Norwegian expatriate sportspeople in France
Sportspeople from Stavanger
21st-century Norwegian women